Eschweilera reversa, synonym Eschweilera pittieri, is a species of woody plant in the Lecythidaceae family. It is found in Colombia, Ecuador, and Panama.

References

reversa
Flora of Colombia
Flora of Ecuador
Flora of Panama
Least concern plants
Taxonomy articles created by Polbot